This is a list of butterflies of Namibia. About 224 species are known from Namibia, six of which are endemic.

Papilionidae

Papilioninae

Papilionini
Papilio nireus lyaeus Doubleday, 1845
Papilio demodocus Esper, [1798]

Leptocercini
Graphium antheus (Cramer, 1779)
Graphium porthaon (Hewitson, 1865)
Graphium angolanus (Goeze, 1779)
Graphium schaffgotschi (Niepelt, 1927)

Pieridae

Coliadinae
Eurema brigitta (Stoll, [1780])
Eurema hecabe solifera (Butler, 1875)
Catopsilia florella (Fabricius, 1775)
Colias electo (Linnaeus, 1763)

Pierinae
Colotis amata williami Henning & Henning, 1994
Colotis antevippe gavisa (Wallengren, 1857)
Colotis celimene pholoe (Wallengren, 1860)
Colotis danae annae (Wallengren, 1857)
Colotis danae walkeri (Butler, 1884)
Colotis doubledayi (Hopffer, 1862)
Colotis euippe omphale (Godart, 1819)
Colotis evagore antigone (Boisduval, 1836)
Colotis evenina (Wallengren, 1857)
Colotis ione (Godart, 1819)
Colotis lais (Butler, 1876)
Colotis pallene (Hopffer, 1855)
Colotis regina (Trimen, 1863)
Colotis vesta mutans (Butler, 1877)
Colotis eris (Klug, 1829)
Colotis subfasciatus (Swainson, 1833)
Colotis agoye agoye (Wallengren, 1857)
Colotis agoye bowkeri (Trimen, 1883)
Eronia leda (Boisduval, 1847)
Pinacopterix eriphia (Godart, [1819])
Nepheronia buquetii (Boisduval, 1836)
Nepheronia thalassina sinalata (Suffert, 1904)

Pierini
Appias sylvia nyasana (Butler, 1897)
Pontia helice (Linnaeus, 1764)
Mylothris agathina (Cramer, 1779)
Belenois aurota (Fabricius, 1793)
Belenois creona severina (Stoll, 1781)
Belenois gidica abyssinica (Lucas, 1852)

Lycaenidae

Miletinae

Miletini
Lachnocnema bibulus (Fabricius, 1793)
Lachnocnema durbani Trimen & Bowker, 1887
Thestor protumnus aridus van Son, 1941

Poritiinae

Liptenini
Alaena amazoula congoana Aurivillius, 1914
Alaena brainei Vári, 1976 (endemic)
Cnodontes pallida (Trimen, 1898)

Aphnaeinae
Chrysoritis chrysantas (Trimen, 1868)
Trimenia macmasteri mijburghi Dickson, 1980
Trimenia wykehami (Dickson, 1969)
Cigaritis ella (Hewitson, 1865)
Cigaritis homeyeri (Dewitz, 1887)
Cigaritis modestus (Trimen, 1891)
Cigaritis mozambica (Bertoloni, 1850)
Cigaritis namaquus (Trimen, 1874)
Cigaritis natalensis (Westwood, 1851)
Cigaritis phanes (Trimen, 1873)
Axiocerses tjoane (Wallengren, 1857)
Axiocerses amanga amanga (Westwood, 1881)
Axiocerses amanga baumi Weymer, 1901
Aloeides aranda (Wallengren, 1857)
Aloeides namibiensis Henning & Henning, 1994
Aloeides damarensis (Trimen, 1891)
Aloeides molomo krooni Tite & Dickson, 1973
Aloeides taikosama (Wallengren, 1857)
Aloeides simplex (Trimen, 1893)
Aloeides tearei Henning & Henning, 1982
Aloeides nollothi Tite & Dickson, 1977
Aloeides argenteus Henning & Henning, 1994
Aphnaeus erikssoni Trimen, 1891
Tylopaedia sardonyx sardonyx (Trimen, 1868)
Tylopaedia sardonyx cerita Henning & Henning, 1998
Phasis clavum Murray, 1935

Theclinae
Myrina silenus ficedula Trimen, 1879
Myrina silenus suzannae Larsen & Plowes, 1991
Hypolycaena philippus (Fabricius, 1793)
Hemiolaus caeculus tsodiloensis (Pinhey, 1969)
Leptomyrina henningi Dickson, 1976
Leptomyrina lara (Linnaeus, 1764)
Iolaus alienus sophiae Henning & Henning, 1991
Iolaus mimosae pamelae (Dickson, 1976)
Iolaus nasisii (Riley, 1928)
Iolaus obscurus Aurivillius, 1923 (endemic)
Iolaus silarus brainei Henning & Henning, 1984
Stugeta bowkeri tearei Dickson, 1980
Stugeta subinfuscata Grünberg, 1910
Pilodeudorix obscurata (Trimen, 1891)
Deudorix antalus (Hopffer, 1855)
Deudorix dinochares Grose-Smith, 1887

Polyommatinae

Lycaenesthini
Anthene amarah (Guérin-Méneville, 1849)
Anthene contrastata mashuna (Stevenson, 1937)
Anthene otacilia (Trimen, 1868)

Polyommatini
Cupidopsis cissus (Godart, [1824])
Cupidopsis jobates (Hopffer, 1855)
Pseudonacaduba sichela (Wallengren, 1857)
Lampides boeticus (Linnaeus, 1767)
Cacyreus dicksoni Pennington, 1962
Cacyreus lingeus (Stoll, 1782)
Leptotes pirithous (Linnaeus, 1767)
Leptotes pulchra (Murray, 1874)
Tuxentius calice (Hopffer, 1855)
Tuxentius melaena (Trimen & Bowker, 1887)
Tarucus sybaris linearis (Aurivillius, 1924)
Zintha hintza krooni (Dickson, 1973)
Zizeeria knysna (Trimen, 1862)
Actizera lucida (Trimen, 1883)
Zizula hylax (Fabricius, 1775)
Brephidium metophis (Wallengren, 1860)
Azanus jesous (Guérin-Méneville, 1849)
Azanus ubaldus (Stoll, 1782)
Eicochrysops hippocrates (Fabricius, 1793)
Eicochrysops messapus mahallakoaena (Wallengren, 1857)
Euchrysops barkeri (Trimen, 1893)
Euchrysops dolorosa (Trimen & Bowker, 1887)
Euchrysops malathana (Boisduval, 1833)
Euchrysops osiris (Hopffer, 1855)
Euchrysops subpallida Bethune-Baker, 1923
Freyeria trochylus (Freyer, [1843])
Lepidochrysops michellae Henning & Henning, 1983 (endemic)
Lepidochrysops patricia (Trimen & Bowker, 1887)
Lepidochrysops plebeia (Butler, 1898)
Lepidochrysops vansoni (Swanepoel, 1949)

Nymphalidae

Danainae

Danaini
Danaus chrysippus orientis (Aurivillius, 1909)
Tirumala petiverana (Doubleday, 1847)
Amauris niavius (Linnaeus, 1758)
Amauris tartarea Mabille, 1876

Satyrinae

Melanitini
Melanitis leda (Linnaeus, 1758)

Satyrini
Heteropsis perspicua (Trimen, 1873)
Heteropsis simonsii (Butler, 1877)
Ypthima asterope asterope (Klug, 1832)
Ypthima asterope hereroica van Son, 1955
Coenyropsis natalii (Boisduval, 1847)
Physcaeneura panda (Boisduval, 1847)
Stygionympha robertsoni (Riley, 1932)
Stygionympha irrorata (Trimen, 1873)

Charaxinae

Charaxini
Charaxes varanes vologeses (Mabille, 1876)
Charaxes candiope (Godart, 1824)
Charaxes jasius saturnus Butler, 1866
Charaxes brutus natalensis Staudinger, 1885
Charaxes bohemani Felder & Felder, 1859
Charaxes achaemenes Felder & Felder, 1867
Charaxes brainei van Son, 1966
Charaxes guderiana (Dewitz, 1879)
Charaxes zoolina (Westwood, [1850])

Nymphalinae

Nymphalini
Vanessa cardui (Linnaeus, 1758)
Junonia hierta cebrene Trimen, 1870
Junonia natalica (Felder & Felder, 1860)
Junonia oenone (Linnaeus, 1758)
Junonia orithya madagascariensis Guenée, 1865
Protogoniomorpha parhassus (Drury, 1782)
Precis antilope (Feisthamel, 1850)
Precis octavia sesamus Trimen, 1883
Hypolimnas misippus (Linnaeus, 1764)

Biblidinae

Biblidini
Byblia anvatara acheloia (Wallengren, 1857)
Byblia ilithyia (Drury, 1773)

Epicaliini
Sevenia amulia benguelae (Chapman, 1872)
Sevenia pechueli (Dewitz, 1879)
Sevenia rosa (Hewitson, 1877)
Sevenia trimeni (Aurivillius, 1899)

Limenitinae

Limenitidini
Pseudacraea poggei (Dewitz, 1879)

Neptidini
Neptis jordani Neave, 1910

Adoliadini
Hamanumida daedalus (Fabricius, 1775)

Heliconiinae

Acraeini
Acraea acara acara Hewitson, 1865
Acraea acara melanophanes Le Cerf, 1927
Acraea anemosa Hewitson, 1865
Acraea brainei Henning, 1986 (endemic)
Acraea hypoleuca Trimen, 1898 (endemic)
Acraea neobule Doubleday, 1847
Acraea trimeni Aurivillius, 1899
Acraea zetes (Linnaeus, 1758)
Acraea acrita ambigua Trimen, 1891
Acraea atolmis Westwood, 1881
Acraea nohara Boisduval, 1847
Acraea atergatis Westwood, 1881
Acraea axina Westwood, 1881
Acraea caldarena Hewitson, 1877
Acraea ella Eltringham, 1911
Acraea lygus Druce, 1875
Acraea natalica Boisduval, 1847
Acraea stenobea Wallengren, 1860
Acraea acerata Hewitson, 1874
Acraea encedon (Linnaeus, 1758)
Acraea serena (Fabricius, 1775)
Acraea esebria Hewitson, 1861
Acraea burni Butler, 1896
Acraea rahira Boisduval, 1833

Vagrantini
Phalanta phalantha aethiopica (Rothschild & Jordan, 1903)

Hesperiidae

Coeliadinae
Coeliades forestan (Stoll, [1782])
Coeliades libeon (Druce, 1875)
Coeliades pisistratus (Fabricius, 1793)

Pyrginae

Celaenorrhinini
Eretis melania Mabille, 1891
Sarangesa gaerdesi gaerdesi Evans, 1949
Sarangesa gaerdesi smithae Vári, 1976
Sarangesa phidyle (Walker, 1870)
Sarangesa seineri Strand, 1909
Alenia namaqua Vári, 1974

Tagiadini
Caprona cassualalla Bethune-Baker, 1911
Abantis paradisea (Butler, 1870)
Abantis tettensis Hopffer, 1855
Abantis zambesiaca (Westwood, 1874)

Carcharodini
Spialia colotes transvaaliae (Trimen & Bowker, 1889)
Spialia delagoae (Trimen, 1898)
Spialia depauperata australis de Jong, 1978
Spialia diomus ferax (Wallengren, 1863)
Spialia mafa (Trimen, 1870)
Spialia nanus (Trimen & Bowker, 1889)
Spialia secessus (Trimen, 1891)
Spialia spio (Linnaeus, 1764)
Gomalia elma (Trimen, 1862)

Hesperiinae

Aeromachini
Kedestes callicles (Hewitson, 1868)
Kedestes lepenula (Wallengren, 1857)
Kedestes monostichus Hancock & Gardiner, 1982
Kedestes sublineata Pennington, 1953 (endemic)
Andronymus neander (Plötz, 1884)
Zophopetes dysmephila (Trimen, 1868)
Platylesches neba (Hewitson, 1877)
Platylesches shona Evans, 1937
Platylesches tina Evans, 1937

Baorini
Pelopidas mathias (Fabricius, 1798)
Pelopidas thrax (Hübner, 1821)
Borbo borbonica (Boisduval, 1833)
Borbo fallax (Gaede, 1916)
Borbo fatuellus (Hopffer, 1855)
Borbo gemella (Mabille, 1884)
Gegenes niso (Linnaeus, 1764)
Gegenes pumilio gambica (Mabille, 1878)

Heteropterinae
Metisella willemi (Wallengren, 1857)

See also
List of moths of Namibia
Wildlife of Namibia

References

Seitz, A. Die Gross-Schmetterlinge der Erde 13: Die Afrikanischen Tagfalter. Plates
Seitz, A. Die Gross-Schmetterlinge der Erde 13: Die Afrikanischen Tagfalter. Text 

 But

Namibia
Namibia
Butterflies